Jan Friš (born 19 December 1995) is a Czech middle-distance runner specialising in the 1500 metres. He won the silver medal at the 2019 Summer Universiade.

International competitions

Personal bests
Outdoor
800 metres – 1:49.47 (Turnov 2018)
1000 metres – 2:20.05 (Ostrava 2017)
1500 metres – 3:40.85 (Dessau 2019)
One mile – 4:01.41 (Ostrava 2019)
3000 metres – 8:03.54 (Pliezhausen 2019)
5000 metres – 14:34.49 (Tampere 2019)
3000 metres steeplechase – 9:01.13 (Plzeň 2019)
Indoor
800 metres – 1:50.51 (Ostrava 2017)
1500 metres – 3:41.96 (Kirchberg 2019)
One mile – 4:08.96 (Athlone 2018)
3000 metres – 8:10.70 (Ostrava 2018)

References

1995 births
Living people
Czech male middle-distance runners
Athletes from Prague
Czech Athletics Championships winners
Universiade silver medalists for the Czech Republic
Universiade medalists in athletics (track and field)
Medalists at the 2019 Summer Universiade
Charles University alumni